Catonetria is a monotypic genus of  dwarf spiders containing the single species, Catonetria caeca. It was first described by Alfred Frank Millidge & N. P. Ashmole in 1994, and has only been found on Ascension Island.

See also
 List of Linyphiidae species

References

Linyphiidae
Monotypic Araneomorphae genera
Spiders of Oceania